Iain MacDonald is an Irish entrepreneur. He is the founder of Perlico, an Irish telecommunications company.

Education 
MacDonald studied economics and information studies at Blackrock College and University College Dublin.

Career 
MacDonald started his career as a salesman at Intergraph, a software company in Dublin.

MacDonald founded Perlico in 2003, an Irish consumer telecommunications company, and later sold it to Vodafone Ireland in a 2007 deal reportedly worth €80 million contingent on subsequent earnings.

In 2009, MacDonald founded "Weeedle", later renamed SkillPages, a skills-based social network.

References

Living people
Irish businesspeople
Year of birth missing (living people)